Louis-François Aubry, who was born in Paris in 1770, studied under Vincent and Isabey, and became celebrated as a portrait painter. He exhibited at the Salon of 1810 portraits of the King and Queen of Westphalia, which were praised for their colouring. He died in about 1850.

One of his students was Anne Nicole Voullemier.

References

 

18th-century French painters
French male painters
19th-century French painters
1770 births
1850s deaths
Year of death uncertain
Painters from Paris
19th-century French male artists
18th-century French male artists